There are over 20,000 Grade II* listed buildings in England. This page is a list of these buildings in the district of East Cambridgeshire in Cambridgeshire.

List

|}

See also
Grade I listed buildings in Cambridgeshire
 Grade II* listed buildings in Cambridgeshire
 Grade II* listed buildings in Cambridge
 Grade II* listed buildings in South Cambridgeshire
 Grade II* listed buildings in Huntingdonshire
 Grade II* listed buildings in Fenland
 Grade II* listed buildings in Peterborough (unitary)

Notes

External links

East Cambridgeshire District
 
Lists of Grade II* listed buildings in Cambridgeshire